Jens Eisert, born 9 October 1970, is a German physicist, ERC fellow, and professor at the Free University of Berlin.

He is known for his research in quantum information science and quantum many-body theory in condensed matter physics. He has made significant contributions to entanglement theory and the study of quantum computing, as well as to the development of protocols in the quantum technologies and to the study of complex quantum systems. Work on compressed sensing quantum state tomography he has contributed to has been influential for developing notions of benchmarking and the verification of quantum devices. The concept of a graph state has become a relevant class of multi-qubit quantum states with a number of applications in quantum computing. He has contributed to realizing a first dynamical quantum simulator, in joint work with Immanuel Bloch, Ulrich Schollwöck and others, building on his work on non-equilibrium quantum physics. In quantum many-body theory, he has helped understanding the role of area laws for entanglement entropies in quantum physics that are at the root of the functioning of tensor network methods. He is also notable as one of the co-pioneers of quantum game theory with Maciej Lewenstein and PhD advisor Martin Wilkens.

Education
He attended high school at the Wilhelm von Humboldt Gymnasium, Ludwigshafen, Germany. He
obtained his first degree in physics from the University of Freiburg and his master's degree in mathematics and physics from the University of Connecticut under a Fulbright scholarship.
In 2001, he obtained his PhD from University of Potsdam under Martin Wilkens with a thesis
entitled Entanglement in Quantum Information Theory.

Career
In 2001–2002, he was a Feodor Lynen Fellow at Imperial College London. In 2002–2003, he was a visiting scholar at Caltech.
During 2002–2005, he was a junior professor at the University of Potsdam. During the 2005–2008 period he was a lecturer at Imperial College London. In 2008, he became a full professor at the University of Potsdam and in 2011 a full professor at the Free University of Berlin. In 2009–2010, he was a fellow at the Institute for Advanced Study, Berlin.

He is a divisional associate editor of the Physical Review Letters.

See also
Quantum Aspects of Life
Quantum game theory

Notes

External links

German Homepage of AG Eisert – QMBT, QIT, and quantum optics at FU Berlin, Germany
English Homepage of AG Eisert – QMBT, QIT, and quantum optics at FU Berlin, Germany
Eisert's homepage
Eisert's Scientific Commons profile
Eisert on INSPIRE-HEP

1970 births
Living people
21st-century German physicists
Quantum physicists
University of Connecticut alumni
University of Freiburg alumni
University of Potsdam alumni
California Institute of Technology faculty
Academic staff of the University of Potsdam
Academic staff of the Free University of Berlin
People from Ludwigshafen
Academics of Imperial College London
European Research Council grantees